Saint Eustratius may refer to:

People 
Eustratius the Wonderworker
Eustratius of Antioch
Eustratius, companion of Orestes of Cappadocia

Places 
Agios Efstratios, Greek island

See also 
Saint Eustace, also spelled Eustachius or Eustathius